Sampaje  is a village in the southern state of Karnataka, India. It is located in the Madikeri taluk of Kodagu district in Karnataka. It lies on NH-275 which connects Mangalore city in Dakshina Kannada district with Madikeri town in Kodagu distrtict. It is a border village in between Kodugu and Dakshina kannada.

Demographics
 India census, Sampaje had a population of 5304 with 2639 males and 2665 females.

Education
G M P School Sampaje serves the primary education to the pupils.
The 'Sampaje Padavi Poorva College' is serving as the major institution providing education up to PUC in Arts. The Administrative Officer Mr. Deviprasad founded the Sampaje High School on 13/6/1966 which later became a college.

Agriculture
Agriculture is the main occupation of the people. Plantations of rubber, betelnut, coconut, cashew are major source of production. Bee-keeping is also carried out.

Bio-diversity
Sampaje lies in the Western Ghat region of India. Sampaje is a beautiful place full of different species of animals and birds. Monkeys, Peacocks, Woodpecker and wide variety of trees form the bio-diversity of the region.

Language
Major languages spoken are Kannada, Tulu, Kodava and Are Bhashe

Image gallery

See also
 Sullia
 Shiradi
 Charmadi
 Panathur
 Malom
 Ghat Roads

References

External links
 http://dk.nic.in/

Villages in Dakshina Kannada district